Eduard Hromádka (1 March 1909 – 19 April 1966) was a Czech alpine skier. He competed in the men's combined event at the 1936 Winter Olympics.

His elder brother Karel was an international ice hockey player.

References

External links
 

1909 births
1966 deaths
Czech male alpine skiers
Olympic alpine skiers of Czechoslovakia
Alpine skiers at the 1936 Winter Olympics
Czechoslovak male alpine skiers
Sportspeople from Prague